The women's 20 kilometres walk was held on a 2 kilometre course comprising lengths of The Mall between Buckingham Palace and Admiralty Arch on 13 August.

Summary
Defending champion, Olympic champion and defending champion Liu Hong was absent. Still the race started faster than the Olympics. A pack of 20 formed on the front. That pack was whittled down to 10 by the halfway point. After Kimberly García (Peru) fell off the pace, the group was reduced to just five by the 12-kilometre mark: two Chinese, Yang Jiayu and Lü Xiuzhi; María Guadalupe González (Mexico); Antonella Palmisano (Italy); and Erica de Sena (Brazil). de Sena fell off the pace when the other four accelerated the pace at 16K.  Another lap later, Palmisano couldn't handle the pace which looked like the break for the three medalists. Yang didn't have the same awards, but she was leading the group with the Olympic silver and bronze medalists.

The three were racing to the finish.  Less than 100 metres before the finish, the chief judge stepped out to show Lü the red card signifying she had accumulated three red cards from judges around the course and was disqualified.  Lü didn't believe the message and tried to finish, but it was true.  Yang raced González to the line, winning by barely a second.  Palmisano came in 17 seconds later to get an unexpected bronze.  The top five did negative splits (walking the end of the race faster than the beginning).  de Sena improved her own South American continental record.  Four others set national records.

Records
Before the competition records were as follows:

The following records were set at the competition:

Qualification standard
The standard to qualify automatically for entry was 1:36:00.

Results
The final took place on 13 August at 12:21. The results were as follows:

References

20 km walk
Racewalking at the World Athletics Championships